Haro is the name of a river that flows through Khyber Pakhtunkhwa  and parts of Punjab. Its main valley is in Abbottabad District in the Hazara Division of Khyber Pakhtunkhwa province, northern Pakistan. The famous Khanpur Dam has been built on this river at Khanpur in the Haripur District of Hazara Division to provide drinking water to the twin cities i.e. Islamabad (the capital of Pakistan) and Rawalpindi. The decrease in inflows of Khanpur dam from Haro River results in water shortage in the twin cities during summer season.

The Haro river rises at the southern end of Dunga Gali range where it has two branches. The eastern branch of the river is called Dhund and the western is called Karral. The River Haro enters Rawalpindi district near Bhallan and the enters Attock District.

References

Rigvedic rivers
Indus basin
Rivers of Khyber Pakhtunkhwa
Rivers of Pakistan